Parjanya according to the Vedas is a deity of rain, thunder, lightning, and the one who fertilizes the earth. It is another epithet of Indra, the Vedic deity of the sky and heaven.

Description
It is assumed Parjanya is the udder and lightning is the teats of the rain-cow, accordingly rain represents her milk. Also he is sometimes considered as a rain-bull controlled by the superior Indra.  The thunder is his roar. He is the father of arrow or reed which grows rapidly in rainy season. He is also considered as a protector of poets and an enemy of flesh-eating fire.

Meanings
According to his 1965 Sanskrit–English Dictionary, Vaman Shivram Apte gives the following meanings:
 Rain-cloud, thunder cloud, a cloud in general;
 Rain (as referred in the Shloka from Bhagavad Gita Chapter 3 Verse 14);
 The god (deva) of rain i.e. Indra.

In hymns

Two hymns of the Rigveda, 5.83 and 7.101, are dedicated to Parjanya. In Vedic Sanskrit Parjanya means "rain" or "raincloud". Prayers dedicated to Parjanya, to invoke the blessings of rains are mentioned in the Atharvaveda.
Parjanya was also one of the Saptarishi (Seven Great Sages Rishi) in the fifth Manvantara. He is one of the 12 Adityas and according to the Vishnu Purana, the guardian of the month of Kartik, a Gandharva and a Rishi in the Harivamsa.

In relation to other deities

The deity can be identified with various other Indo-European Gods such as Slavic Perun, Lithuanian Perkūnas, Latvian Pērkons and Finnish Perkele "god of thunder",   Gothic fairguni "mountain", and Mordvin language Pur'ginepaz.

Rig Veda hymns to Parjanya

RV 5.83 in the translation of Jamison and Brereton:

Buddhism
Parjanya also features is Buddhist literature. In the Pali Canon of the Theravāda, he is known as Pajjuna.

He is king of the vassavalāhaka devas who have limited control over the clouds and weather. He has a daughter named Kokanadā.

References

Hindu gods
Rigvedic deities
Sky and weather gods
Thunder gods
Gandharvas
Buddhist gods